William Kaye (c.1820 – 10 May 1893) was a politician in colonial Victoria, member for Eastern Province in the Victorian Legislative Council.

Kaye was born in Yorkshire, England, and arrived in Port Phillip District in February 1842. He was a partner in a Melbourne firm of squatters' auctioneers, Kaye and Butchart. He was elected to the first wholly elective Legislative Council for Eastern Province, being sworn-in on 1 November 1856. Kaye was disqualified from the Council on 1 February 1857 for bribery under the Election Act. He had been found guilty by a committee of the Legislative Council, following a petition by William Highett, alleging that Kaye's payment of £200 to an election agent to campaign for him in the electorate had amounted to bribery. The payment was found to have "induced [the agent] to exert a corrupt influence upon the election, by other means than the giving of money".

References

 

1820s births
1893 deaths
19th-century Australian politicians
Members of the Victorian Legislative Council
People from Yorkshire
English emigrants to Australia